Trinité Sport Football Club is a French association football club founded in 1930. They are based in the town of La Trinité, Alpes-Maritimes and their home stadium is the Stade du Rostit. As of the 2009–10 season, they play in the Championnat de France amateur 2 Group E.

External links
Trinité SFC official website 

Association football clubs established in 1930
1930 establishments in France
Sport in Alpes-Maritimes
Football clubs in Provence-Alpes-Côte d'Azur